Jan Maletka (1921-1942) was a Polish railway worker. On 20 August 1942 he was murdered by the Germans for providing water to Jews being transported to the Treblinka concentration camp. On 26 November 2021 a plaque commemorating him has been revealed in the village of Treblinka, which has sparked a controversy.

References 

1921 births
1942 deaths
Polish people in rail transport
Polish people executed by Nazi Germany
Polish people who rescued Jews during the Holocaust